Point Comfort can refer to the following places in the United States:

Point Comfort, Texas
Point Comfort, Wisconsin
Point Comfort (Harrisville, New Hampshire), a historic house
New Point Comfort, Virginia
Old Point Comfort, Virginia